Loukas Hadjiloukas  (born on 6 June 1967) is a Cypriot football manager and former football player.

He had a great career while playing for APOEL, in which he won three Championships (1990, 1992, 1996), 5 Cups (1993, 1995, 1996, 1997, 1999) and 4 Super Cups (1992, 1993, 1996, 1997).

He was the chief scout for APOEL for several years. He served as the manager of Digenis Akritas Morphou and ASIL Lysi. He became Cypriot First Division manager during November 2012, taking over Doxa Katokopias.

Honours
APOEL
 Cypriot First Division (3): 1989–90, 1991–92, 1995–96
 Cypriot Cup (5): 1992–93, 1994–95, 1995–96, 1996–97, 1998–99
 Cypriot Super Cup (4): 1992, 1993, 1996, 1997

External links
 
 Loukas Hadjiloukas at Soccerway

References

1967 births
Living people
People from Paphos
Cypriot footballers
Cyprus international footballers
Cypriot First Division players
Cypriot football managers
APOEL FC players
ASIL Lysi managers

Association football midfielders